Kalsholmen Lighthouse is a coastal lighthouse in Meløy Municipality in Nordland county, Norway.

The lighthouse was first established on the islet of Tennholmen in 1916, but it was destroyed by a windstorm in 1917. In 1919, the lighthouse was then rebuilt on the islet just to the east, Kalsholmen. It was automated in 1993.

The light is white, red or green (depending on direction) occulting twice every 8 seconds.

See also

Lighthouses in Norway
List of lighthouses in Norway

References

External links
 Norsk Fyrhistorisk Forening 
 Picture of Kalsholmen Lighthouse

Lighthouses completed in 1916
Lighthouses completed in 1919
Meløy
Lighthouses in Nordland